Dumont, meaning "from the mount" in French, may refer to:

People 
 Dumont (surname)
 Dumont de Montigny (1696-after 1753), French explorer and author

Places 
Brazil
 Dumont, São Paulo

United States
 Dumont, Colorado
 Dumont, Iowa
 Dumont, Minnesota
 Dumont, New Jersey
 Dumont, Texas
 South Houston, Texas, formerly Dumont

Other uses 
 Dumont (TV program), a Canadian news program 2009–2012
 DuMont Laboratories, an American television equipment manufacturer
 DuMont Television Network, which broadcast in the United States from 1946 until 1956
 M. DuMont Schauberg, a German publishing house
 Ulmus × hollandica 'Dumont', a hybrid elm cultivar